N-acetyllactosamine synthase is a galactosyltransferase enzyme. It is a component of lactose synthase This enzyme modifies the connection between two molecule UDP-galactose and N-actyl-D-glucosamine and generates two different molecules UDP and N-acetyllactosamine as products. The main function of the enzyme is associated with the biosynthesis of glycoproteins and glycolipids in both human and animals. In human, the activity of this enzyme can be found in Golgi apparatus.

It is classified under .

The lack of this enzyme leads to glycolysation which is a serious neurological disease. The nature of the disease causes fluid in the brain, abnormal inflammatory response and abnormal bleeding issues.

See also 
 N-Acetylglucosamine

References

External links 
 

EC 2.4.1